West Coast Line may refer to:
 West Coast Line (Malaysia)
 West Coast Line (Sweden)
 West Coast line (Taiwan)
 West Coast Main Line, United Kingdom
 West Coastway Line, United Kingdom
 West Coast Line (Wessel, Duval & Company) shipping company
 The West Coast Railway in New Zealand, see Wellington–Manawatu Line